Raymond Webb Thompson, Jr. (March 12, 1911 – February 14, 1999) was an American competition swimmer who represented the United States at the 1932 Summer Olympics in Los Angeles, California.  Thompson placed sixth in the men's 100-meter freestyle, recording a time of 59.5 seconds in the final.

See also
 List of United States Naval Academy alumni

External links
  Raymond Thompson – Olympic athlete profile at Sports-Reference.com
 Raymond Thompson's obituary

1911 births
1999 deaths
American male freestyle swimmers
Navy Midshipmen men's swimmers
Olympic swimmers of the United States
People from Bethesda, Maryland
Swimmers at the 1932 Summer Olympics